1957 in the Philippines details events of note that happened in the Philippines in the year 1957.

Incumbents

 President:
Ramon Magsaysay (Nacionalista Party) (until March 17)
Carlos P. Garcia (Nacionalista Party) (starting March 17) 
 Vice President:
Carlos P. Garcia (Nacionalista Party) (until March 18)
Diosdado Macapagal (Liberal) (starting December 30)
 Chief Justice: Ricardo Paras 
 Congress: 3rd (until December 10)

Events

March
 March 17 – President Magsaysay dies in a plane crash. Vice President Carlos P. Garcia assumes the presidency.

June
 June 12 – Silay becomes a city in the province of Negros Occidental through Republic Act 1621.
 June 20 - The Anti-Subversion Act is signed into law outlawing the Communist Party of the Philippines, its military arm commonly known as the Hukbalahap, as well as potential succeeding organizations.

November
 November 14 – Carlos P. Garcia is elected president in the presidential elections.

Holidays

As per Act No. 2711 section 29, issued on March 10, 1917, any legal holiday of fixed date falls on Sunday, the next succeeding day shall be observed as legal holiday. Sundays are also considered legal religious holidays. Bonifacio Day was added through Philippine Legislature Act No. 2946. It was signed by then-Governor General Francis Burton Harrison in 1921. On October 28, 1931, the Act No. 3827 was approved declaring the last Sunday of August as National Heroes Day.

 January 1 – New Year's Day
 February 22 – Legal Holiday
 April 18 – Maundy Thursday
 April 19 – Good Friday
 May 1 – Labor Day
 July 4 – Philippine Republic Day
 August 13  – Legal Holiday
 August 25  – National Heroes Day
 November 28 – Thanksgiving Day
 November 30 – Bonifacio Day
 December 25 – Christmas Day
 December 30 – Rizal Day

Births

 January 4 – Rafael Nantes, governor of the Province of Quezon, Philippines from 2007 to 2010. (d. 2010)
 January 17 – Hilda Koronel, actress
 January 20 – Jessie Dellosa, Chief of staff of the Philippine Armed Forces
 January 22 – Rene Requiestas, Filipino actor and comedian. (d. 1993)
 January 30 – Paeng Nepomuceno, six-time World Bowling Champion Filipino bowler
 February 13 – Francisco Duque III, current Philippine Secretary of Health
 February 14 – Rolando Navarrete, Filipino ex-boxer
 February 23 – Mel Sta. Maria, Filipino lawyer, broadcaster, professor in Ateneo Law School and dean of Far Eastern University Institute of Law since November 2013
 March 23 – Victoria Sy-Alvarado, Filipino politician.
 April 22 – Jaime Aristotle Alip, Filipino entrepreneur, politician and the Founder and managing director of the CARD Mutually Reinforcing Institutions
 May 6 – Benedicto Ducat, Filipino impressionist painter
 May 13 – Mar Roxas, former Senator of the Philippines
 June 21 –Luis Antonio Tagle, Roman Catholic Filipino Cardinal
 July 20 – Judith Cajes, Filipino politician
 August 4 – Mark Joseph, actor (d. 2020)
 August 19 – Maria Isabel Lopez, actress
 September 7:
Richie D'Horsie, actor and comedian (d. 2015)
Weng Weng, Filipino actor and martial artist (d. 1992)
 September 8 – Liza Maza, member of the Philippine House of Representatives
 September 13 – Bongbong Marcos, 17th President of the Philippines
 September 23 – Bernardo Piñol, Jr., Filipino politician and journalist.
 October 7 – Joey Marquez, Filipino actor, comedian, and politician.
 November 12 – Abdulmunir Mundoc Arbison, Filipino politician
 November 14 – Ronnie Lazaro, actor
 December 8 – Rodolfo Luat, Filipino professional pool player
 December 14 – Tim Cone, American PBA head coach
 December 24 – Frederick Adams, basketball player
 December 26 – Rey Fortaleza, Olympic boxer

Date unknown
Julie Ann Fortich, Filipino actress
Prisco Nilo, Filipino meteorologist.

Deaths
 March 17:
 Ramon Magsaysay, President of the Philippines (b. 1907)
 Tomas Cabili, journalist, educator and assemblyman from Lanao (b. 1903)
 June 14 - Maria Beatriz del Rosario Arroyo, Filipino nun and the founder of the Dominican Sisters of the Most Holy Rosary of the Philippines (b. 1884)
 August 4 - Eugenio Pérez, Filipino politician (b. 1896)

References